The Historic House Trust of New York City was formed in 1989 as a public-private partnership with the New York City Department of Parks and Recreation to preserve the historic houses located within New York City parks, although most of the houses were not originally city-owned. The Trust works with the individual houses to restore and promote the houses as a means of educating residents and visitors about the social, economic and political history of New York City and cast urban history in a new light. The Trust includes 23 historic sites, with 18 operating as museums and attracting 729,000 annual visitors.

Properties

The Historic House Trust includes properties in each of New York City's five boroughs, and there is a house for every period in the City's history, depending on one's scheme of dividing history.   A number of the properties have live-in caretakers to help prevent vandalism and other problems.

History
In 1988, the City Parks department established a Historic House Office to preserve the 23 City-owned historic house-museums located in City parks. This office gave way to the Historic House Trust of New York City in 1989, funded by private donations, as well as grants, with the goal of each house becoming a professionally accredited museum. In an effort to increase awareness of the program during its first year of operation, the Trust developed a so-called passport program wherein visitors would receive stamps each time they visited one of the houses. If a visitor went to all 23 properties, they would receive an audience with the Mayor. HHT's passport program was brought back in 2008 as a method of commemorating the Trust's 20th anniversary.

The Trust also holds events such as the Historic Houses Festival, during which all the houses are open with different events at each, in order to raise awareness. New properties are added to the Trust when they come under city control if private care-taking or ownership has not succeeded, although the contents of the home may remain under private ownership.

References

External links
 

 
Houses in New York City
Landmarks in New York City
Organizations based in New York City